The 1982 Los Angeles Raiders season was the team's 23rd season, 13th season in the National Football League, and first of thirteen seasons in Los Angeles.

In May 1982, a verdict was handed down against the NFL in the lawsuit brought by the Raiders and the Los Angeles Memorial Coliseum in 1980. The jury ruled that the NFL violated antitrust laws when it declined to approve the proposed move by the team from Oakland to Los Angeles. The Raiders promptly moved to Los Angeles although for the 1982 season the team continued to practice in Alameda.

Despite the Raiders' disappointing 7–9 record in their previous season—their last in Oakland until 1995—the Raiders cruised to an 8–1 record in the strike-shortened 1982 season, winning all four of their home games, and clinching home-field advantage throughout the NFL's makeshift playoff tournament for 1982. However, in the second round of the playoffs, the Raiders blew a fourth-quarter lead to the 6th-seeded Jets, losing 17–14, ending the Raiders' season.

The last remaining active member of the 1982 Los Angeles Raiders was running back Marcus Allen, who retired after the 1997 season.

Offseason

Roster

Season

Schedule

Season summary

Week 1

Week 2

Week 3

This was the first ever home regular season game in Los Angeles for the Raiders.

Week 4

Week 5

    
    
    
    
    
    
    
    

Marcus Allen 24 Rush, 156 Yds

Week 6

    
    
    
    
    
    
    

Jim Plunkett 18/33, 303 Yds

Week 8

Standings

Post season

References

External links
1982 Los Angeles Raiders season at Pro Football Reference

1982
Los Angeles Raiders
Los